Sibu may refer to:

Places 
 Sibu, Sarawak in East Malaysia
 Sibu District
 Sibu Division
 Sibu (federal constituency), represented in the Dewan Rakyat
 Sibu (crater), an impact crater on Mars
 Pulau Sibu, an island off Johor state, the eastern coast of peninsular Malaysia

People 
 Sibu Misra, Bharatiya Janata Party politician from Assam
 Sibu Soren (born 1944), Indian politician, Chief Minister of Jharkhand

Religion 
 Sibú, a Costa Rican deity

See also
 Mana Sibu, one of the 180 woredas in the Oromia Region of Ethiopia
 Sibu Sire, one of woredas in the Oromia Region of Ethiopia
 Sibiu, a city in Romania, capital of Sibiu County
 Sibo (disambiguation)
 Cebu (disambiguation)